The song "Silent Worship" is a 1928 adaptation by Arthur Somervell of the aria "Non lo dirò col labbro" from Handel's 1728 opera Tolomeo (Ptolemy). Somervell's English-language adaptation is for voice and piano, and it has remained a popular classic in song recitals and home music-making. Other arrangements of Somervell's translation include voice accompanied by a modern symphony orchestra, and male choir.

Handel / Somervell comparison

Musically Arthur Somervell's song is a simple transcription of the original Handel aria – with the orchestral parts reduced for piano, one or two slight changes in harmony, and the instrumental ending (postlude) omitted.

The text is treated quite differently in the two versions:
 In the original Italian baroque aria as set by Handel, the first part of the aria uses a single couplet to express a single two-fold thought: "I will not say it with my lips, they do not have the courage". The words are repeated several times, to emphasize the lack of courage. The second part of the aria expresses a complement to the first, its antithesis – twice as many words for half as much music – and therefore not repeated: "Perhaps, with sparks from yearning eyes, my gaze will speak to reveal how I am consumed by flames". The first part of the aria is then repeated, in A–B–A da capo aria form.
 Somervell's English adaptation took the basic thought and recast it to suit the aesthetic of a later era. Somervell expanded a two-line description of a static emotional state into a 16-line narrative, in which only a single line is repeated. Even the da capo – the reprise of the first part at the end – has a new paraphrase of the first text rather than the simple verbatim repetition which the baroque aria uses.

Popular culture
"Silent Worship" is featured in the 1996 film adaptation of Jane Austen's novel Emma, where it is sung by Gwyneth Paltrow (as Emma) and Ewan McGregor (as Frank Churchill). Although Somervell's 1928 English adaptation of the 1728 Handel aria was done more than a century after Austen's 1815 novel, the original Italian aria was recorded in Jane Austen's own handwritten songbooks. In the film, Somervell's piano introduction to the song is shortened.

"Silent Worship"
Did you not hear My Lady
Go down the garden singing?
Blackbird and thrush were silent
To hear the alleys ringing.

Oh saw you not My Lady
Out in the garden there?
Shaming the rose and lily
For she is twice as fair.

Though I am nothing to her
Though she must rarely look at me
And though I could never woo her
I love her till I die.

Surely you heard My Lady
Go down the garden singing?
Silencing all the songbirds
And setting the alleys ringing.

But surely you see My Lady
Out in the garden there,
Rivaling the glittering sunshine
With a glory of golden hair.

"Non lo dirò col labbro"
Allessandro's cavatina in act 1 of Tolomeo:

Non lo dirò col labbro
Che tanto ardir non ha.

Forse con le faville
Dell'avide pupille,
Per dir come tutt'ardo,
Lo sguardo parlera.
I will not say it with my lips 
Which have not that courage.

Perhaps the sparks 
Of my burning eyes,
Revealing my passion,
My glance will speak.

References

External links
, Kenneth McKellar (tenor), Orchestra of the Royal Opera House, Adrian Boult (conductor)
, Thomas Allen (baritone)
, Romina Basso (mezzo-soprano), Il Complesso Barocco, Alan Curtis (conductor)

Compositions by Arthur Somervell
1928 songs
English songs
Art songs
Arias by George Frideric Handel